Crossman Pond is a  pond in Kingston, Massachusetts, located off Wapping Road (Route 106) and South Street. The pond is hydro logically associated with a cranberry bog operation located to the west of the pond. The outflow is an unnamed stream that feeds the cranberry bog, ultimately leading to Fountainhead Brook, a tributary of the Jones River. The water quality is impaired due to non-native aquatic plants.

External links
Environmental Protection Agency
South Shore Coastal Watersheds - Lake Assessments

Ponds of Plymouth County, Massachusetts
Ponds of Massachusetts